The following is a list of the cities in India through which major rivers flow.

Andhra Pradesh

Assam

Bihar

Delhi 
 Capital of India

Daman

Gujarat 

|-
|}

Kerala

Karnataka

Madhya Pradesh

Maharashtra

Odisha 
Anadapur || Baitarani

Punjab

Rajasthan

Sikkim

Tamil Nadu

Telangana

Uttar Pradesh

Uttarakhand

West Bengal

Notes

References

Rivers
Cities